The A952 road is a main road in Aberdeenshire, Scotland. This roadway is a north–south connector that serves as an inland bypass to the more coastally aligned A90 road. It runs from Toll of Birness in the south to Cortes in the north, passing through the communities of Ardallie, Clola, Mintlaw and New Leeds. It has been noted that traffic accidents are most frequent at pronounced road bends along the A952.

History
The local area is rich with prehistorical and historical features. Somewhat to the east of the A952 road are a number of prehistoric monuments including Catto Long Barrow, Silver Cairn and many tumuli. In that same vicinity of the Laeca Burn watershed is the point d'appui of historic battles between invading Danes and indigenous Picts.

See also
 Laeca Burn

References

Roads in Scotland
Transport in Aberdeenshire